Amy Hart Redford (born October 22, 1970) is an American actress and filmmaker.

Early life 
Amy Redford's parents are historian and environmental activist Lola Van Wagenen and film director and actor Robert Redford.

She received her BA in Drama/Theatre Arts in 1994 from San Francisco State University. She also attended the University of Colorado Boulder and studied theatre in England at LAMDA.

Career 
She has acted in such films as Maid in Manhattan, This Revolution, Sunshine Cleaning, The Last Confederate: The Story of Robert Adams, and The Understudy, and on such television shows as Sex and the City, Law & Order: Criminal Intent, and The Sopranos.  Redford directed the film The Guitar which premiered at the 2008 Sundance Film Festival. She also starred in the film When I Find the Ocean.

In 2022, Redford directed Roost which had its world premiere at the 2022 Toronto International Film Festival. She also served as a producer on The Lincoln Project for Showtime, directed by Karim Amer and Fisher Stevens.

References

External links 
 
 Amy Redford Mahalo
 Interview on IndieWire
 The Last Confederate: The Story of Robert Adams

1970 births
American film actresses
American film directors
American film producers
American television actresses
American women film directors
Living people
Place of birth missing (living people)
San Francisco State University alumni
University of Colorado Boulder alumni
American women film producers
21st-century American women